Telewizja Toruń (cable TV of Toruń) is a local Polish TV station that was founded in 1992. It has 120,000 viewers. The TV Toruń is also an internet and telephone provider for the city of Toruń. 

The main program is News Torun (Aktualności Toruńskie), theme refers to the most important events in the city and its surroundings broadcast from Monday to Sunday at 17.45, 20.00 and 21.45. 
TV employs a dozen journalists, editors and cameramen, has three television studios. Director of TV Toruń is Jerzy Muchewicz.

References

External links
 Official Website

Television channels in Poland
Television channels and stations established in 1992
Mass media in Toruń